Lavoslav Kadelburg (26 August 1910 – 12 December 1994) was a Yugoslavian lawyer, judge, polyglot and activist.

Born in Vinkovci on 26 August 1910 to a Croatian Jewish family, Kadelburg completed his secondary education there. Before the Nazi invasion of Yugoslavia in April 1941, he had been a reserve officer of the Royal Yugoslav Army. He was interned in POW camps in Germany during World War II. With Dr. Albert Vajs, Kadelburg helped tend to surviving Yugoslavian Jews in the aftermath of the Holocaust.

References

Sources
 Encyclopaedia Judaica, 2nd edition (ISBN#?)

External links
AJC archive files
 Kadelburg's biography

1910 births
1994 deaths
People from Vinkovci
Croatian Jews
Austro-Hungarian Jews
Croatian Austro-Hungarians
Jewish activists
Holocaust survivors
Yugoslav prisoners of war
World War II prisoners of war held by Germany